The 1977–78 season was Al-Minaa's 4th season in the Iraqi National League, having featured in all editions of the competition. Al-Minaa participated in the  Iraqi National League and the Iraq FA Cup, winning the league for the first time in their history, after finishing two points ahead of second-place Al-Zawraa. The season saw the dismissal of first-team coach Faleh Hassan Wasfi after scoring a draw in the first two games of the season and being eliminated from the Iraqi FA Cup in the round of 16 before that, and then the appointment of coach Jamil Hanoon. Striker Jalil Hanoon scored 11 goals to end the league season as the league's top goal-scorer total.

Squad

Pre-season

Iraqi National League

Summary table

Matches

Iraq FA Cup

Statistics

Overall statistics

Last updated: September 2017

References

Sources
 Iraqi League 1977/1978
 [http://www.niiiis.com/c77-78.html Iraq FA Cup 1977/1978]
 Al-Minaa SC History

External links
Iraq - List of final tables (RSSSF)

Al-Mina'a SC seasons